Sam Voutas is an Australian actor and independent filmmaker. He is best known for writing and directing Red Light Revolution, China's "first sex shop comedy" which was nominated for Best Unproduced Screenplay at the 2008 Australian Inside Film Awards, showcased at The Santa Barbara International Film Festival and won the audience award at The Terracotta Far East Film Festival. Voutas played Durdin in Lu Chuan's acclaimed City of Life and Death, a Chinese film about The Rape of Nanjing. The film won Best Director (Lu Chuan) and Best Cinematographer (Cao Yu) Awards at the 4th Asian Film Awards in 2010.
Voutas wrote and directed the documentary The Last Breadbox, featuring Beijing taxi drivers in the run-up to the 2008 Olympic Games.

Career
Voutas was born in Canberra, Australia and is of Greek ancestry. His mother is from Melbourne and his father Anthony is from Kastania. While his mother was an official in the Australian Public Service, the family lived in China from 1986 to 1989. Voutas returned to China in 2005 and speaks Mandarin fluently.

He graduated from The Victorian College of the Arts.

Red Light Revolution was originally written in English, translated into Chinese, then that version was re-translated to reflect the Beijing slang hua. It was released in China on Tudou in 2011, with producer Melanie Ansley commenting that "We wanted to make a film that might have challenged censors, and if that was the case we were shutting ourselves off from television and cinema. I think the internet offers a place for stuff that takes a little more risk." It won the People's Choice Award at the Singapore International Film Festival's Silver Screen Awards in 2011.

In 2017, Sam directed King of Peking  based on his original screenplay that he had been inspired to write based on his memories of life in Beijing in the 90's and the upcoming birth of his child which had got him thinking about the pressures of fatherhood.

Voutas has spoken in interviews about film censorship in China, saying "I'd love to keep making movies [in China], my dilemma is whether a script can be passed by the censors without having its wings clipped. My fear is that increasingly censors are the directors of films, and that directors and producers, fearing cuts, then self-censor themselves from the get-go. That's an environment that isn't too conducive to creativity in general. So perhaps my next film will be about censors themselves and the final cut will run exactly zero seconds long."

Filmography

References

Year of birth missing (living people)
Living people
Australian filmmakers
Male actors from Canberra
Australian emigrants to China
Victorian College of the Arts alumni
Australian people of Greek descent